Sérgio Henriques Gomes is a former Brazilian footballer who plays as a striker. He was the first Brazilian to play in the Scottish Premier Division when he appeared for Dundee United in 1995. He made 14 league appearances for the club, scoring three goals.

References

External links

1969 births
Living people
Brazilian footballers
Brazilian expatriate footballers
Expatriate footballers in Portugal
Tupi Football Club players
Amora F.C. players
Dundee United F.C. players
Scottish Football League players
Expatriate footballers in Scotland
Brazilian expatriate sportspeople in Kuwait
Kuwait SC players
Expatriate footballers in Kuwait
People from Juiz de Fora
Association football forwards
Kuwait Premier League players
Brazilian expatriate sportspeople in Portugal
Brazilian expatriate sportspeople in Scotland
Sportspeople from Minas Gerais